Xenodrepanites is an extinct ammonoid cephalopod genus belonging to the Ceratitida from the Upper Triassic of the Himalayas. Xenodrepanites has a very compressed, discoidal shell with a ventral furrow bordered by crenulated keels and a sub-ammonitic suture.

Some put Xenodrepanites in the Clydonitacan family, Cyrtopleuritidae instead.

References 

Ceratitida genera
Triassic ammonites
Triassic animals of Asia